Macarena Rosset (born 23 February 1991) is an Argentine basketball player for San Giovanni Valdarno and the Argentina women's national basketball team.

She defended Argentina at the 2018 FIBA Women's Basketball World Cup.

References

External links

1991 births
Living people
Argentine expatriate sportspeople in Italy
Argentine women's basketball players
Argentine expatriate basketball people in Germany
Argentine expatriate basketball people in Italy
Argentine expatriate basketball people in Spain
Shooting guards
Basketball players from Buenos Aires